Ceann is an American rock band from Pittsburgh, Pennsylvania Most commonly known for their song "Pittsburgh Makes Me Drunk". Their influences include Pat McCurdy, The Kingston Trio, Great Big Sea, Cake, The Pogues, Johnny Cash, Flogging Molly, Ween, They Might Be Giants, The Town Pants, Barenaked Ladies and Willie Nelson.

History

Patrick Halloran and Marc Wisnosky started the band in college. They wanted to play some Irish songs at a party on St. Patrick's Day, so they learned a few of the classic Irish pub tunes and wrote a couple of original Pittsburgh-themed Irish songs. They started off by playing at an open mic event. They began to play about fifteen to twenty Irish songs and then would eventually switch to songs by 'N Sync, Hanson, Snoop Dogg, NWA.

Ceann formed as an Irish rock band in Pittsburgh in 2005 with the release of their first album of all-original material Almost Irish. Before that, Ceann was an acoustic trio consisting of Halloran, Wisnosky, and James G. Telfer IV, that played Irish pub music across the northeast. Ceann continued to mix fun Irish music with their popular originals. While some of Ceann's songs revolve around the culture of being Irish Americans, many of Ceann's most popular songs have distinctively more contemporary themes. Their songs appeal far beyond the normal reach of Irish music and have given them access to unprecedented markets for an Irish band. As one of the only Irish bands to find success on commercial radio, Ceann's fan base has grown as quickly outside of Irish music circles as quickly as it's grown within them. Their cross market appeal allowed them to be featured at Irish festivals and at non-Irish music festivals to equal success. 

On February 1, 2011 lead singer Patrick Halloran was killed in a car accident in Vermont. The remaining members of Ceann, along with past members, played together at Halloran's memorial service.

In the summer of 2013, various Ceann members got together in Pittsburgh, PA, New York, NY, and Virginia Beach, VA to play shows in support of the tribute album The Legend of Handsome Pat, a compilation of songs written by Halloran and recorded by various artists. Produced by Halloran's brother, Brian Halloran, the album features contributions by Brian Halloran, Ceann, Paul Tabachneck, The Hang Lows, Icewagon Flu, Scythian, The Havers, Peanut Butter & Julie, The Fighting Jamesons, Cruel Seamus, and Patrick Halloran.

Name

Ceann is pronounced "Key-ANN". It means head. The original name was Ceann na Caca, which is Gaelic for "Head of Poop." It wasn't supposed to be funny or clever. Ceann was only going to play one show to parody The Pogues' original name, Pogue Mahone, which means "kiss my ass". They realized that some people became hesitant to book them because of the name, so they shortened it to Ceann.

Sound
Five to six guys of ambiguous descent playing something that may or may not sound like Irish music. Some people say we sound like or may be influenced by the following bands: Cake, Stephen Lynch, Johnny Cash, Flogging Molly, Ween, Great Big Sea, They Might Be Giants, Barenaked Ladies, Black 47, The Pogues.

Members
Patrick Halloran (1999–2011), vocals, guitar
Jeffrey A Hoag (2005–present), mandolin, acoustic/electric guitar, vocals, banjo, harmonica
Brian Halloran (2011–present), vocals, guitar & (2008–2009) bass guitar
Scott Taylor (2005–present), drums, vocals
Tom Snodgrass (2009–present), bass guitar
Dan Rusnak (2008–present), baritone saxophone
Greg Sloan (2008–present), alto saxophone
Brian Fitzgerald (2010–present), electric violin
Patrick "Tricky" Manion (2008–2010, 2011–present), fiddle
John Shea (2004–2006), drums
James Gleason (2004–2006), banjo
James G. Telfer, IV (2000–2008), bass guitar, fiddle, bodhran, vocals
Marc Wisnosky (1999–present), vocals, tin whistle, bodhran, Irish tenor banjo

Discography 

Key’-anna ‘Ka-ka, n. – 2001
 Us Drunk Live – 2003
 Almost Irish – 2006
Rave, Rant, Lose Pants – 2007
Making Friends – 2008
It's Not Hard – 2009
Last One's Standing – 2010
 The Legend of Handsome Pat – 2013 (contributed "The Sun is My Least Favorite Star')

References
 

Musical groups established in 2005
Rock music groups from Pennsylvania
Musical groups from Pittsburgh
2005 establishments in Pennsylvania